Crelle may refer to
August Leopold Crelle, a German mathematician
Crelle's Journal, named after its founder August Crelle, formally the Journal für die reine und angewandte Mathematik.